The Ecuadorian Social Security Institute (Spanish: Instituto Ecuatoriano de Seguridad Social (IESS)), is an autonomous entity that is part of the social security system of Ecuador and is responsible for implementing the mandatory universal insurance, according to the Constitution of the Republic, in force since 2008.

The Ecuadorian Constitution states that social security is an inalienable right of all people. Social security is governed by the principles of solidarity, obligation, universality, equity, efficiency, subsidiarity, adequacy, transparency and participation.

History
In 1937 the Law on Mandatory Social Security Insurance Fund of Private Employees and Workers was created and the Medical Department was linked to it. On July 14, 1942, the new Law on Compulsory Social Security, in which new insurance conditions and the financing of all general insurance pensions became established, with the State's contribution of 40%, is issued, and the sickness and maternity insurance benefits among some members is joined.

On September 19, 1963, by Supreme Decree No. 517, the Pension Fund and Insurance Fund combine to create the National Housing and Medical Insurance by Supreme Decree No. 40 of July 25, 1970, published in the Official Gazette No. 15 of 10 July 1970. The National Social Security Fund becomes the Ecuadorian Social Security Institute (IESS).

In 1988, the National Assembly amends the Constitution of the Republic and establishes the permanence of the IESS as the only independent institution responsible for the implementation of the General Compulsory Insurance.

Features and services

Benefits and services are delivered through four specialized Insurance: health, pensions, social security and peasant work risks.

Health Insurance Benefits: 
 Medical care: outpatient and specialist, hospitalization, surgery, drugs, emergency, diagnostic laboratory tests and imaging, orthotics and   prosthetics
 Preventive dental care and recovery
 Maternity Care: before and after delivery
 Monetary sickness and maternity allowances
 Programs for the elderly

Pension Insurance Benefits
 Ordinary retirement of old age
 Retirement disability including temporary disability allowance
 Pension pawnshop
 Help funeral
 Special Retirements: telecommunications workers, the arts and printing industry, and the harvest workers
 Additional Revenue: railways, tax and graphics teaching
 Improvements retirement age

Features Work Risk Insurance
 Medical, surgical, pharmacological, hospital and rehabilitation through the Health Insurance Individual and Family
 Provide and renews prosthetic and orthotic devices
 Outplacement
 Payments of subsidies, compensation or pension income in the form of capital or, in cases of temporary, partial and total disability
 Prevention Services: studies, analyzes, evaluations and risk controls work in places where work is under way

Benefits of the Seguro Social Campesino
 Promotion, prevention, health, sanitation and community development
 Preventive dental care and recovery
 Care during pregnancy, childbirth and postpartum
 Retirement pensions for disability and old age
 Help defray funeral expenses

External links 
 Sitio web oficial de la institución

Government of Ecuador